Alexander Allen is an American North American champion bridge player and an American Contract Bridge League (ACBL) Grand Life Master.

Bridge accomplishments

Wins
 North American Bridge Championships (1)
 Truscott Senior Swiss Teams (1) 2022

Personal life
Alexander is married to Renee Gibson.

References

American contract bridge players
Living people
1953 births